AirAttack is a 2010 action video game developed and published by Slovak studio Art In Games.

Design
Touch Arcade notes "AirAttack departs from the traditional 2D platform of vertical shoot-em-ups and opts for a fully realistic 3D world", creating a point of difference from other similar games of this nature.

Gameplay
AirAttack is an action video game played from top-down perspective and three-dimensional environment. At the beginning of the game, the player starts with three planes, resembling the F4U Corsair, P-38 Lightning and a Yakolev Yak-3. They must choose one from the three and start their fight. The latter planes also use flamethrower and fireball. A flamethrower is used to burn all types of enemies, while the fireball serves the plane as deflection from crashing into another planes with swift pivotal circulation. The player's plane has a primary weapon that fires continuously at a constant velocity that can attack aerial enemies, land enemies except the train, and certain buildings. The plane is manipulated by moving it along screen, possibly using mouse, tilting the device, joypad and relative touch (manual input sensitivity). Double tapping the screen drops a bomb that can destroy land enemies and buildings in order to collect coins. Shop also appears throughout the level. Player can enter it to buy gadgets such as homing rockets, super rockets, turrets, shields, side planes, lightnings, bombs that can destroy wider area, extra lives, cannons, and timewraps (provides slow motion technique).

Reception 

The game received generally positive reviews from critics. Aggregating review website GameRankings provides an average rating of 78.75% based on 4 reviews, whereas Metacritic provides an average rating of 84 out of 100 based on 6 reviews, meaning generally favorable reviews.

Sequel 

A sequel has been released in 2015 by Art In Games.

References

External links 

2010 video games
IOS games
Action video games
Android (operating system) games
Video games developed in Slovakia
Shoot 'em ups